Gonderange is a town in the commune of Junglinster, in central Luxembourg. , the town has a population of 1,735 inhabitants.

Cyclist Franz Neuens, who competed at the 1936 Summer Olympics, was born here.

References

Junglinster
Towns in Luxembourg